Lester Eugene Siler, a convicted drug dealer in the United States, was beaten and tortured by Campbell County, Tennessee police during an interrogation at his home, during which officers attempted to coerce Siler to sign a consent form giving them permission to search his home without a warrant.

On July 8, 2004, police officers entered the house of Siler and tortured him using various methods, including applying electricity to his genitalia.  Upon arrival, the officers asked his wife, Jenny, and son, Austin, to leave. Before the torture, however, Siler's wife set up an audio recorder which captured a large portion of the incident.

Five officers, Gerald David Webber, Samuel R. Franklin, Joshua Monday, Shayne Green, and William Carroll were convicted in federal court of the beatings and attempted cover-up. They received prison sentences ranging from 51 to 72 months.

In 2016, a jury trial resulted in a $115,000 award to Siler. This was appealed by Siler for being inadequately low, but the Tennessee Court of Appeals upheld the verdict.

References

External links
 Audio stream of the recording. Here is the direct MMS URL for the stream: mms://wms.scripps.com/knoxville/siler/siler.mp3 . Note that this file is actually an ASF file with a misnamed MP3 filename extension, of which in turn contains the audio recording in the MP3 format. The raw (demuxed) MP3 audio of the recording is here available for download; mirrors: here, here and here.
 Audio Recording.
 Revised transcript of the Siler recording  by FBI Special Agent Joshua T. McKinney, Federal Bureau of Investigation, date of revised transcript: January 19, 2005; Case 3:05-cr-00013, Document 13, Filed July 1, 2005. Also available here and here.
 KnoxNews Archive. 

Living people
American torture victims
Corruption in the United States
Police brutality in the United States
Crimes in Tennessee
Year of birth missing (living people)